Christophe Samson (born 1 March 1984) is a French rugby union player. His position is Lock and he currently plays for Castres Olympique in the Top 14. He began his career with La Rochelle in the Pro D2 before moving to home-town club Clermont Auvergne in 2007. He moved to Toulon in 2010. He made his international debut in June 2012 during France's 2012 tour of Argentina.

Honours

Club 
 Castres
Top 14 (2): 2012–13, 2017–18

References

External links

1984 births
Living people
French rugby union players
Sportspeople from Clermont-Ferrand
Racing 92 players
Rugby union locks
France international rugby union players